An alpenstock ( "alpine" +  "stick, staff") is a long wooden pole with an iron spike tip, used by shepherds for travel on snowfields and glaciers in the Alps since the Middle Ages. It is the antecedent of the modern ice axe. 

French-speaking climbers called this item a "baton". Josias Simler, a Swiss professor of theology at what later became the University of Zurich, published the first treatise on the Alps, entitled De Alpibus commentarius. T. Graham Brown described Simler's observations on gear for travel over ice and snow in the mountains: "In 1574, Simler published a commentary on the Alps which is remarkable for its description of the technique of glacier travel and for its proof that Simler himself had practical experience. He describes the alpenstock, crampons, the use of the rope, the necessity of protecting the eyes on snow by veils or spectacles; and he mentions that the leader on snow covered glaciers sounds for hidden crevasses with a pole."

Yvon Chouinard quotes Simler as writing, "To counteract the slipperiness of the ice, they firmly attach to their feet shoes resembling the shoes of horses, with three sharp spikes in them, so that they may be able to stand firmly. In some places they use sticks tipped with iron, by leaning upon which they climb steep slopes. These are called alpine sticks, and are principally in use among the shepherds."

On August 8, 1786, Jacques Balmat and Michel-Gabriel Paccard made the first ascent of Mont Blanc. Balmat, a chamois hunter and crystal collector, had experience with high mountain travel, and Paccard had made previous attempts to climb the peak. Illustrations show Balmat carrying two separate tools (whose respective functions would later be re-assigned to the ice axe): an alpenstock (or baton), and a small axe that could be used to chop steps on icy slopes.

In the second half of the nineteenth century, seeing that the traditional but unwieldy alpenstock might be a useful aid to climb steep slopes of snow or ice, Victorian alpinists fastened a sharpened blade (the pick) to the top of the alpenstock; this was used to provide stability. On the opposite end, a flattened blade was placed (the adze), which was used for cutting steps in the snow or ice, an essential technique for moving over steep icy slopes before the advent of the crampon. Gradually, the alpenstock evolved into the ice axe.

Literary references

References

Alps
Axes
Mountaineering equipment